Henryk Pająk (born 1937) is a Polish writer, journalist and publisher.

Biography
Coming from a peasant family living in the back country, Pająk nevertheless went on to study philology at the Maria Curie-Skłodowska University in the city. He then became teacher of Polish language in a gymnasium and contributed to a farm newspaper in Lublin (Sztandar Ludu). In 1965, he founded a poets association in 1965 called "Prom". In 1969, he compiled Henryk Cybulski's memoirs, Czerwone noce (Red nights) about Przebraże Defence, the self-defence of Poles against the Ukrainian UPA. Pająk wrote then a novel based on this subject matter, Los (Fate) in 1969. 

A prolific writer, Henryk Pająk wrote many novels and poems which made him notable locally such as Druga śmierć (Second death) in 1971, Tam, za snem (There, for sleep) in 1991 (received 2 literary awards) or Wolny (Free) in 1992. He also headed the Lublin's section of the Polish union of writers (Związek Literatów Polskich). Under the communist regime, he was a member of the PZPR but left it during the Martial law in 1981.

After the collapse of communism, he created a book publishing company « Wydawnictwo Retro ». Since, he has written many books, such as a book about the Polish communist regime in 1997 (Rządy zbirów 1940-1990 [Governments of criminals]), written with Stanisław Żochowski (one of the NSZ confunders), or a biography of Józef Piłsudski (Ponura prawda o Piłsudskim [Gloomy truth about Piłsudski], in 2005). He also wrote a well-documented inquiry on the former communist secret police — the UB-SB — in 3 volumes (1993-94). Following the publication of this book, he was called to testify for the new intelligence agency UOP.

Works

Notes and references

1937 births
Living people
20th-century Polish journalists
21st-century Polish journalists
Polish male writers